Luciana Frassati Gawronska (18 August 1902 – 7 October 2007) was an Italian writer and author. Gawronska was a prominent anti-Nazi and anti-Fascist activist in both Poland and Italy and was considered a champion of Roman Catholic causes.

Early life
Luciana Frassati was born on 18 August 1902 in Pollone, Italy, near the municipality of Biella.  Her father, Alfredo Frassati, was the founder of the Torino based newspaper, La Stampa, a well-known, daily newspaper. Her mother, Adélaïde Ametis, was a well known painter.

Frassati's brother was Pier Giorgio Frassati, who died of polio in 1925.  Her brother was formally beatified as "Blessed Pier Giorgio Frassati" by Pope John Paul II on 20 May 1990. Frassati Gawronska later wrote a first hand account of her brother's life, A Man of the Beatitudes. She campaigned throughout her life in the effort to elevate her brother to canonized sainthood, although this has not yet occurred.

Frassati earned a law degree from the University of Turin. She married Jan Gawroński in the spring of 1925. Gawronski was a diplomat and secretary to the Polish ambassador to Italy and the Vatican at the time. Gawroński would later become the last Polish ambassador to Austria before the country's annexation by Nazi Germany in 1938. The couple had six children: Jas, Alfredo, Wanda, Giovanna, Maria Grazia and Nella. Her son, Jas Gawronski, is currently an Italian journalist, politician and former Member of the European Parliament.

World War II
Luciana lived in a number of European countries with her husband, including Germany, Turkey, and Poland. The couple moved to Austria in 1933, just as Adolf Hitler was taking power in neighboring Germany. Jan Gawronski became the last ambassador of Poland to Austria before Austria's annexation by Nazi Germany in the 1938 Anschluss.

Luciana and her family moved to Warsaw, Poland, after the annexation of Austria. They lived in the city until the invasion and fall of Poland to the Germans in 1939. The Germans immediately began to round up Polish officials, intellectuals and others. Luciana's Italian citizenship (Italy was then ruled by Benito Mussolini, an ally of Hitler), and her relationship with prominent figures throughout Europe, afforded the family some protection from the Nazis.

Frassati Gawronska acted to help Poland during World War II. With her Italian passport, which allowed her to move freely between Poland and Italy, she made seven separate trips throughout Europe's German Nazi held territories during the war, including to Warsaw, Kraków, Berlin and Rome. Frassati Gawronska managed to smuggle rescued artwork and documents linking the Nazis to atrocities out of Poland at great personal risk. She also distributed money to the Polish resistance.

She also managed to rescue and move Polish families out of the country. Many, including entire families, were sent to relative safety in Italy. Among those rescued by Luciana Frassati Gawronska were Olga Helena Zubrzewska, wife of Gen. Władysław Sikorski, a major political figure and one of the leaders of the Polish resistance. Through her influence she also managed to secure the release of more than one hundred professors of the University of Krakow.

Honors
Luciana Frassati Gawronska received the Order of Merit of the Republic of Poland from the Polish government in 1993 for her service to the country.  She was also named an admired woman of Poland in the 1 March 2003 issue of Wysokie Obcasy, joining other Polish and international figures.

Death
Luciana Frassati Gawronska died on 7 October 2007, at the age of 105 at her home in Pollone, Italy. Her funeral was held on 9 October 2007 at the Turin Cathedral. She was buried in her family's tomb in the space once occupied by the coffin of her brother, Blessed Pier Giorgio Frassati, whose remains have since been moved to the Turin Cathedral.

References

External links
Luciana Frassati Gawronska obituary

1902 births
2007 deaths
Italian centenarians
Italian people of World War II
Italian Roman Catholics
Italian women writers
Polish resistance members of World War II
University of Turin alumni
Roman Catholic activists
Recipients of the Order of Merit of the Republic of Poland
People from Biella
Polish women in war
Women centenarians
Italian emigrants to Poland
20th-century Italian women